In the United Kingdom, a civic society is a voluntary body or society which aims to represent the needs of a local community. Some also take the role of an amenity society.

A civic society may campaign for high standards of planning of new buildings or traffic schemes, conservation of historic buildings, and may present awards for good standards. They may organise litter collections or "best kept village" cleanups.

Civic Voice
Civic Voice replaced the former Civic Trust and acts as an umbrella organisation for a large number of local civic and amenity societies.

References

See also 
 Community league, the equivalent in parts of Canada
 Birmingham Civic Society
 Bourne Civic Society
 Nottingham Civic Society